Carlo Turcato (22 September 1921 – 2 June 2017) was an Italian fencer. He won a silver medal in the team sabre event at the 1948 Summer Olympics.

References

1921 births
2017 deaths
Italian male fencers
Olympic fencers of Italy
Fencers at the 1948 Summer Olympics
Olympic silver medalists for Italy
Olympic medalists in fencing
Medalists at the 1948 Summer Olympics